This is a list of awards and honours received by Tomáš Masaryk.

Scholastic
Awards

Honorary degrees

National orders

Foreign orders

References

Masaryk, Tomáš